Parker W. Fennelly (October 22, 1891 – January 22, 1988) was an American character actor who appeared in ten films, numerous television episodes and hundreds of radio programs.

Early life
The son of gardener Nathan Fennelly and Estelle Dolliver Fennelly, he was born and raised in Northeast Harbor, Maine, and studied classical acting in Boston, where he was a member of the  Toy Theater company and participated in Chautauqua readings. He studied under the performing arts educator Leland T. Powers.

Stage
In 1915 and 1916, Fennelly toured on the Midland Chautauqua Circuit with the Maud Scheerer Shakespeare Players. In 1919, he traveled and acted with the Jack X. Lewis Stock Company. Fennelly and his wife, Catherine Reynolds Fennelly, formed the Parker Fennelly Duo, presenting short plays, readings and impersonations (1921–1923).

Fennelly's performances on Broadway included roles in Mr. Pitt (1924), The Small Timers (1925), Florida Girl (1925), Babbling Brookes (1927), Black Velvet (1927), The County Chairman (1936), Yours, A. Lincoln (1942), Our Town (1944), Happily Ever After (1945), Live Life Again (1945), Loco (1946) and The Southwest Corner (1955). His other Broadway credits include directing Technique (1931), providing source material for Fulton of Oak Falls (1937) and writing Cuckoos on the Hearth (1941).

Radio
Fennelly and Arthur Allen played "Yankee codgers" on The Stebbins Boys of Bucksport Point and Snow Village Sketches in the early years of radio.

Allen's Alley
Fennelly personified the crusty New England Yankee in roles on radio, films and television. He was heard weekly as Titus Moody on the "Allen's Alley" segment of Fred Allen's radio show where he delivered his famous opening line, "Howdy, Bub".

Other radio
Fennelly's other roles on radio included the following:

In 1960, Fennelly recorded Moody Speaking, a series of "sparkling one-minute and five-minute vignettes" produced by Banner Radio Company for local stations.

Television and films

Fennelly made numerous appearances on live television shows in the early 1950s, including Lux Video Theatre, The Philco Television Playhouse and Studio One. In 1970–1971, he played Mr. Purdy on Headmaster on CBS. In 1956, he guest-starred on an episode of Father Knows Best as a housepainter.

In film, Fennelly portrayed the millionaire in Alfred Hitchcock's The Trouble with Harry (1955) and he replaced Percy Kilbride as Pa Kettle in the final film of the "Ma and Pa Kettle" series, The Kettles on Old MacDonald's Farm. After Angel in My Pocket (1969), his last movie role was Universal's How to Frame a Figg (1971) starring Don Knotts.

In later years, he became a familiar face as the Pepperidge Farm's television spokesman between 1956 and 1977, delivering the slogan "Pepperidge Farm remembers" in his New England accent, then turned over the role to Charles C. Welch.

Personal life
In 1918, Fennelly met and married Catherine Deane "while both of them were playing in a stock company in Moline, Illinois". They had two daughters, Mary and Jane, and a son, John.

Recordings
In 1950, Fennelly made the children's record "Ride 'Em Cowboy (I and II)" (CGR-1003). In 1953, he recorded another children's item, "Hunters of the Sea" (Record Guild 9006).

Death

Fennelly died on January 22, 1988, aged 96, at his home in Peekskill, New York. He was survived by his wife, two daughters, four grandsons and one great-grandson.

His widow, Catherine Fennelly (1892–1988), died five months later, aged 95. Their remains were interred in Sleepy Hollow Cemetery in Sleepy Hollow, New York.

Filmography

References

Further reading
Old-Time Radio Memories by Mel Simons (BearManor Media).

External links
 

Parker Fennelly papers, 1896-1997, held by the Billy Rose Theatre Division, New York Public Library for the Performing Arts.

1891 births
1988 deaths
20th-century American male actors
American male film actors
American male radio actors
American male stage actors
American male television actors
Burials at Sleepy Hollow Cemetery
People from Northeast Harbor, Maine
Male actors from Maine